Sindou is a department or commune of Léraba Province in south-western Burkina Faso. Its capital is the town of Sindou.

Towns and villages

References

Departments of Burkina Faso
Léraba Province